Maison-Feyne is a commune in the Creuse department in the Nouvelle-Aquitaine region in central France.

Geography
The river Creuse forms a small part of the northeast border of the commune.

Population

Sights
 The church of the Assumption, dating from the twelfth century.

See also
Communes of the Creuse department

References

Communes of Creuse